Easington is a civil parish in Ribble Valley, Lancashire, England.  It contains nine listed buildings that are recorded in the National Heritage List for England.  Of these, one is at Grade II*, the middle grade, and the others are at Grade II, the lowest grade.  The parish is entirely rural.  The oldest listed building is a medieval cross base, and the most important is Hammerton Hall, a country house.  The other listed buildings are all farmhouses or farm buildings.

Key

Buildings

References

Citations

Sources

Lists of listed buildings in Lancashire
Buildings and structures in Ribble Valley